Brigitte Oertel (born 11 October 1953) is a German fencer who competed at the 1972 and 1976 Summer Olympics; in 1976, she finished in 18th and fourth place in the individual and team foil events, respectively. She won a silver medal in the team foil at the 1977 World Fencing Championships.

References

1953 births
Living people
People from Bad Kreuznach (district)
German female fencers
Olympic fencers of West Germany
Fencers at the 1972 Summer Olympics
Fencers at the 1976 Summer Olympics
Sportspeople from Rhineland-Palatinate